Vers l'avenir ("Towards the future"), less commonly known by its Dutch title Naar wijd en zijd, is a Belgian nationalist song which was also the national anthem of the Congo Free State. Upon the annexation of the Congo Free State as a colony of Belgium, this anthem was replaced with La Brabançonne, the national anthem of Belgium. Vers l'avenir'''s lyrics were written by Gentil Theodoor Antheunis (1840–1907). It was also adopted as the anthem of the Rexist Party, a Fascist political movement founded in 1930 by Léon Degrelle.

LyricsLe siècle marche et pose ses jalons,Nous marquant une étape nouvelle.Nous le suivons et nous nous rappelonsNos aïeux et leur gloire immortelle.Si ton sol est petit, dans un monde nouveauL'avenir qui t'appelle a planté ton drapeau.Refrain:Marche joyeux, peuple énergique,Vers des destins dignes de toi.Dieu protège la libre BelgiqueEt son Roi !Ta longue paix autant que longs combatsAu travail exerçait ta vaillance,Et tes progrès disaient à chaque pasTon génie et ta fière endurance.Si ta force déborde et franchit ses niveaux,Verse-la, comme un fleuve, en de mondes nouveaux !Refrain:Marche hardi, peuple énergique,Vers des destins dignes de toi.Dieu saura protéger la BelgiqueEt son Roi !Ô terre sainte, ô terre des aïeux,Leurs sueurs et leur sang t'ont pétrie,Et loin ou près sauront leurs fils pieuxHonorer, élargir la Patrie.Si des frères s'en vont, il en est par milliersQui, fidèles gardiens, défendront tes foyers.Refrain:Va sans faiblir, peuple énergique,Vers des destins dignes de toi.Dieu saura protéger la BelgiqueEt son Roi !''

References

Congo Free State
Democratic Republic of the Congo music
Belgian music
French-language Belgian songs
Historical national anthems
African anthems
Belgian anthems
19th-century songs